

The Martin XT6M was an American biplane torpedo bomber, designed and built by Martin for the United States Navy. Designated XT6M-1, it was powered a  Pratt & Whitney R-1860 radial engine and was delivered in 1930 for evaluation, but no others were built.

References

Citations

Bibliography

 

T6M
Martin T6M
Single-engined tractor aircraft
Carrier-based aircraft
Aircraft first flown in 1930